Aristobulus of Cassandreia (c. 375 BC – 301 BC), Greek historian, son of Aristobulus, probably a Phocian settled in
Cassandreia, accompanied Alexander the Great on his campaigns. He served throughout as an architect and military engineer as well as a close friend of Alexander, enjoying royal confidence, and was entrusted with the repair of the tomb of Cyrus the Great in Pasargadae. He wrote an account, mainly geographical and ethnological. It survives only in quotations by others, which may not all be faithful to the original.  His work was largely used by Arrian. Plutarch also used him as a reference.

References

Ancient Library

External links
Aristobulus at Livius.org
Aristobulus at the Wiki Classical Dictionary

370s BC births
301 BC deaths
4th-century BC Greek people
4th-century BC historians
Architects of Alexander the Great
Ancient Greek architects
Hellenistic military engineers
Engineers of Alexander the Great
Ancient Greek engineers
Ancient Phocians
Ancient Cassandreians
Ancient Greek geographers
Geographers of Alexander the Great
Historians who accompanied Alexander the Great
4th-century BC geographers
4th-century BC architects